The men's normal hill HS100 individual competition at the Ski jumping at the 2017 Asian Winter Games in Sapporo, Japan was held on 22 February at the Miyanomori Ski Jump Stadium.

Schedule
All times are Japan Standard Time (UTC+09:00)

Results

References

Normal Hill Individual Results - FIS
Normal Hill Individual Results - Sapporo Asian Winter Games Official

External links
 Official website

Normal